The 1st New York Cavalry Regiment was a regiment in the  Union Army in the American Civil War . It was also known as the Lincoln Cavalry, Carbine Rangers, Sabre Regiment, and 1st United States Volunteer Cavalry. It was mustered in from July 16 to August 31, 1861. It was mustered out June 27, 1865.

Commanders
Col. Carl Schurz
Col. Andrew T. McReynolds
Col. Alonzo W. Adams

Casualties
The regiment sustained 25 officers and men killed in action, 134 wounded, of whom 23 died and 111 recovered, 384 missing in action, and 120 died of disease and other causes, for a total of 168 casualties. Among its losses were 1st Lieut. Henry B. Hidden, killed March 9, 1862, one of the first Union cavalry officers killed in the Civil War, and Corporal William H. Rihl, the first soldier killed in combat north of the Mason–Dixon line, on June 22, 1863.

See also
List of New York Civil War units

References

Cavalry 001
1861 establishments in New York (state)
Military units and formations established in 1861
Military units and formations disestablished in 1865